A first minister is any of a variety of leaders of government cabinets. The term literally has the same meaning as "prime minister" but is typically chosen to distinguish the office-holder from a superior prime minister. Currently the title of first minister is used to refer to the political leader of a devolved national government, such as the devolved administrations of Scotland, Wales, and Northern Ireland, or of a dependent territory.

Canada

In Canada, a first minister is any of the Canadian first ministers of the Crown, otherwise known as heads of government, including the Prime Minister of Canada and the provincial and territorial premiers. The title is used in such formulae as "first ministers' meetings".

In Newfoundland and Labrador, the Inuit self-governing region of Nunatsiavut provides for a first minister responsible to the Nunatsiavut Assembly.

Norway
The head of government of Norway was called first minister between 1814 and 1873, while it was in personal union with Sweden. In 1893, 12 years prior to the dissolution of the union, it was changed to prime minister (statsminister).

United Kingdom
In the United Kingdom, the term first minister was once used interchangeably with prime minister, such as when Winston Churchill stated: "I did not become His Majesty's First Minister so that I might oversee the liquidation of the British Empire!"

Nowadays, the term is used to describe the leaders of the devolved governments of Scotland, Wales and Northern Ireland. See

List of first ministers
First Minister of Scotland
First Minister of Wales
First Minister and deputy First Minister of Northern Ireland

Other
In Australia, the premiers and chief ministers are the first ministers of the states and territories respectively.

In Germany, the first minister in each federal state is known as the Minister President (Ministerpräsident).

In Malaysia, the first minister for each state with a Malay ruler is known as the Menteri Besar. Meanwhile, the heads of government in the four states without a monarch are called chief ministers.

George Price held the office of First Minister of British Honduras from 1961 until 1964, when it became self-governing and the title was changed to Premier. He continued as Premier after the colony changed its names to Belize, and then as Prime Minister after Belize gained full independence in 1981.

References

Gubernatorial titles
Heads of government
Positions of subnational authority